Chang Heng is a lunar impact crater that is located on the Moon's far side. It lies less than one crater diameter to the northeast of the walled plain Fleming. The rim of this crater is somewhat eroded, with a pair of small craters along the northern rim and tiny craters along the south and east edges. The interior floor contains a small, concentric crater that is about one third the diameter of Chang Heng. The crater is named after Chinese astronomer Zhang Heng.

Satellite craters
By convention these features are identified on lunar maps by placing the letter on the side of the crater midpoint that is closest to Chang Heng.

References

 
 
 
 
 
 
 
 
 
 
 

Impact craters on the Moon